Melrose Park is a suburb of Sydney, Australia,located 12 kilometres north-west of the Sydney central business district. Melrose Park is split between the local government areas of the City of Ryde and the City of Parramatta. It is part of the Northern Sydney region. Melrose Park sits on the northern bank of the Parramatta River.

History

Aboriginal culture
The Wallumedegal Aboriginal tribe lived in the area between the Lane Cove River and Parramatta River, which was known as Walumetta.

European settlement
Melrose Park was the name of the large housing estate subdivided in 1928, with High Water Mark boundaries of riverfront properties, approved by the Sydney Harbour Trust (Roads and Maritime Services). Melrose Park is named in honour of aviator Charles James Melrose (1913–1936). He held a number of flying records, was the only solo flyer to finish the Melbourne Centenary Air Race in 1934 and helped in the unsuccessful search for Sir Charles Kingsford Smith. He died when his plane broke up in turbulence on a charter flight from Darwin to Melbourne. Streets in the suburb also recall other aviators such as Sir Alan Cobham, Jean Batten and Amy Johnson.

Population 
In the 2016 Census, there were 1,574 people in Melrose Park. 68.1% of people were born in Australia and 66.9% of people only spoke English at home. The most common responses for religion were Catholic 35.0%, No Religion 22.9% and Anglican 11.4%.

Transport 
Melrose Park is served by bus route 524, connecting the suburb to West Ryde and Parramatta. The nearest train station is Meadowbank Station, located in the centre of Meadowbank.

Stage 2 of the Parramatta Light Rail is a proposed light rail link between Westmead and Sydney Olympic Park via Parramatta. The project would include the construction of a bridge across the Parramatta River, between Melrose Park and Wentworth Point.

Redevelopment 

The western part of Ermington, located within the City of Parramatta has historically been industrial, including the Australian operations of large pharmaceutical companies such as Pfizer and Reckitt Benckiser. In 2005 the NSW Geographic Names Board approved the “boundary creep” of Melrose Park to include much of the Ermington industrial area, which contravenes Principle 6.8.1 of the NSW Address Policy and User Policy May 2021. This “boundary creep” was instigated by City of Parramatta and NSW Geographic Names Board without consultation with City of Ryde or Melrose Park residents within the Ryde Local Government Area. In February 2016, Payce Consolidated Limited announced plans for a major urban renewal of the industrial part of Melrose Park. This would include the development of 5000 new apartments, new affordable housing, public parks and community facilities. In 2017, Payce Consolidated Limited applied to gain trademark approval for the terms, Melrose Park, Melrose Park Village, & Melrose Park Town Centre from IP Australia without success. An electric shuttle bus service to Meadowbank railway station and West Ryde railway station was proposed. Sustainability proposals include renewable energy generation for new homes, electric charge points for cars, as well as electric shuttle bus services & improved cycleways.
The redevelopment is expected to cost $5 billion.

References

External links

  [CC-By-SA]

Suburbs of Sydney
City of Ryde